Genesium or Genesion or Genese (Γενέση) was a town of ancient Argolis upon the Argolic Gulf, south of Lerna, and north of the mountain pass, called Anigraea, leading into the Thyreatis. Pausanias also calls the place Genethlium or Genethlion (Γενέθλιον), and says less correctly that near it was the spring of fresh water rising in the sea, called Dine; whereas this spring of fresh water is to the south of the Anigraea. 

At Apobathmi (Ἀπόβαθοι), Danaus is said to have landed. Modern scholars equate the locations. The surrounding country was also called Pyramia (Πυράμια), from the monuments in the form of pyramids found here.

Its site is located near the modern Kiveri.

References

Populated places in ancient Argolis
Former populated places in Greece